The 2005 Liga de Fútbol Profesional Boliviano or the Torneo Adecuación was a professional football tournament played by clubs of Bolivia's first division. The purpose of the tournament was to adjust to the European calendar, which traditionally runs from August to May. Thus, this tournament was played from March to July 2005 to make way for the 2005–06 season to start in August 2005. The Torneo Adecuación champions were Bolívar. No relegation took place.

Standings

References

Bolivian Primera División seasons
Bolivia
1